Stanley Clarence Harland (19 June 1940 – 30 August 2001) was an English football centre half.

Career
Born in Liverpool, Harland's football career began at local club New Brighton. It was from here that he attracted interest from Everton who signed him in 1959. Harland moved to Bradford City where he scored 20 goals in 120 league games for the club before being transferred to Carlisle United.

Carlisle won promotion to the Second Division in his first season with the club, Harland played in every game. The arrival of Gordon Marsland saw him lose his first team place and he asked for a transfer.

Harland signed for Swindon Town on 29 July 1966, the day before England beat West Germany in the World Cup Final at Wembley, after Swindon manager Danny Williams and chief scout Jack Conley sat outside Carlisle's ground (Brunton Park) overnight to make sure of his signature.

Harland debuted for the team in the first game of the 1966–67 season against Brighton and Hove Albion, a 2–2 draw. He scored his first goal for the club in a 2–3 defeat to Walsall the following season and was voted 1967-68 Player of the Season. His partnerships with Mel Nurse and later Frank Burrows helped Swindon to reach their successes of the 1960s, forming an effective defence. Harland became team captain on Nurse's departure in 1968 after being ever-present in the first team since his début. As captain, he received the League Cup after defeating Arsenal at Wembley Stadium in 1969.

Harland lost his captaincy and position to Dave Mackay when he joined Swindon in 1971, manager Fred Ford gave him the role of auxiliary defender but Harland was dropped from the team when Mackay took over Coaching of the club as player-manager. His last game for Swindon was a win away at Burnley on 27 November 1971, he assisted the team in ending a six-game run without a victory. Even though he was named Man of the Match, he was sold to Birmingham City for £15,000.

Harland made 38 appearances for Birmingham, helping them win promotion to the First Division in 1972 and reach the FA Cup semi-final of the same year. His career was ended through injury although he moved to become player-manager of Yeovil Town and later worked with Frank Burrows at Portsmouth in a coaching capacity.

Harland was married to an ice-dancing champion and had two daughters, he also often played in the Professional Footballers' Golf Championship. After leaving football he worked in the Supermarket business and continued working up until his death from a heart attack on 30 August 2001 in Tintinhull, Somerset.

Honours
Carlisle United
Third Division Champion 1964-65
Swindon Town
Second Division promotion winner 1969
League Cup winner 1969
Anglo-Italian League Cup winner 1969
Anglo-Italian Cup winner 1970
Birmingham City
Second Division promotion winner 1972

References

External links

Player Profile - Swindon-Town-FC.co.uk
Tribute from Yeovil Town F.C.

1940 births
2001 deaths
New Brighton A.F.C. players
Everton F.C. players
Bradford City A.F.C. players
Carlisle United F.C. players
Swindon Town F.C. players
Birmingham City F.C. players
Yeovil Town F.C. players
Association football defenders
English footballers
Yeovil Town F.C. managers
Footballers from Liverpool
English football managers